Ohyda - The second album, released by Lady Pank in 1984, on the Savitor label.

Track listing
 "Zabij to" - 3:25
 "Tango stulecia" - 5:00
 "Czas na mały blues" - 4:20
 "Rolling son" - 4:05
 "Zabij to cz. II" - 3:30
 "To jest tylko rock and roll" - 3:40
 "Hotelowy kram" - 3:45
 "A to ohyda" - 3:50
 "Swojski Brodłej" - 4:00
 "Szakal na Brodłeju" - 2:30

Personnel
 John Borysewicz - guitar, vocals 
 Janusz Panasewicz - vocals 
 Edmund Stasiak - guitar 
 Paweł Mścisławski - bass guitar 
 Jarosław Szlagowski - drums

Production
 Recording Director - Sławomir Wesołowski
 Sound Operator - Mariusz Zabrodzki
 Music - Jan Borysewicz 
 Lyrics- Andrzej Mogielnicki.

Lady Pank albums
1984 albums